= Kryogenifex =

- Founded: 2002
- Founder: Alejandro Gonzalez
- Headquarters: Miami, Florida
- Area served: International

Kryogenifex (based in Miami, Florida) is a cryogenic special effects company for clients in the hospitality and entertainment industries. Las Vegas's ICE club incorporates the technology. The Axis/Radius club in Scottsdale, Arizona also employs the technology. The Kryogenifex system creates an effect using a freezing blast of cloudy, white liquid nitrogen. In addition to lowering the temperature it tousles hair and hits partiers with ambient force. The systems cost more than $15,000 and use three nozzles to shoot a non-flammable mixture of liquid nitrogen compressed with carbon dioxide that fills a two-story club in about 10 seconds, according to a club director. This cools the area 20 degrees for a few seconds as a white cloud that can be colored with flashing lights fills the area. The effect costs about $75 for 30 seconds of firing.

== History ==
Kryogenifex uses cryogenic gases and liquids, such as liquid nitrogen and CO_{2}, to create special effects for proprietary applications. Founded in 2002 by President and CEO Alejandro Gonzalez, the company creates and supplies automated atmospheric systems for entertainment venues such as nightclubs and restaurants.

Several different products in the Kryogenifex line are available for customization, and the company also offers conceptual design, safety training, installation, and maintenance.

Kryogenifex works with venues around South Florida and California, as well as Las Vegas, Denver, and New York. The company has international clients in Dubai, United Arab Emirates; Sydney, Australia; the Dominican Republic; South Korea; and throughout Europe.

The company won the award for Best Effects Product at the 2003 Club World Awards.
